Faces in the Rocks is the third solo album by the American folk musician Mariee Sioux, released on August 1, 2007 by Grass Roots Record. It was co-produced by Gentle Thunder and Dana Gumbiner. It was recorded, engineered and mastered by Dana Gumbiner.

Track listing

Personnel
Mariee Sioux - vocals, acoustic guitar, accordion
Gentle Thunder - native flutes, percussion (buffalo drum], flute (native American), cymbal, rainstick, bass drum 
Gary Sobonya - Mandolin
Jonathan Hischke - Bass
Luke Janela - Cello
Jeremiah Conte - artworks [Insert Drawings]
Tahiti Pehrson - layout

References

External links

2007 albums
Mariee Sioux albums
Albums produced by Gentle Thunder
Grass Roots Record albums